Flexor digiti quinti brevis muscle can refer to: 
 Flexor digiti quinti brevis muscle (foot)
 Flexor digiti quinti brevis muscle (hand)